John McQueen (February 9, 1804 – August 30, 1867) was an American lawyer and politician. He was U.S. Representative from South Carolina and a member of the Confederate States Congress during the American Civil War.

Early life and education
Born in Queensdale in Robeson County, North Carolina, near the town of Maxton, North Carolina, McQueen completed preparatory studies under private tutors and was graduated from the University of North Carolina at Chapel Hill. He subsequently studied law. He was admitted to the bar in 1828 and commenced practice in Bennettsville, South Carolina. McQueen served in the State militia in 1833–37. He was an unsuccessful candidate for election in 1844 to the 29th United States Congress.

Career
McQueen was elected as a Democrat to the 30th and 
31st Congresses to fill the vacancies caused by the death of Alexander D. Sims. He was reelected to the 32nd and to the four succeeding Congresses, and served from February 12, 1849, until his retirement on December 21, 1860.

American Civil War
An ardent supporter of slavery and southern states' rights, McQueen was elected as a representative from South Carolina in the First Confederate Congress after the outbreak of the American Civil War. Regarding the Confederacy's cause for starting the war, McQueen stated in a December 1860 letter to civic leaders in Richmond, Virginia:

Later life and death
He died at Society Hill, South Carolina, on August 30, 1867, and was interred in the Episcopal Cemetery in Society Hill, South Carolina.

Personal life
He married Sarah Elizabeth Pickens (September 29, 1831 – September 22, 1909 at Asheville, North Carolina), granddaughter of American Revolutionary War General Andrew Pickens on December 31, 1851 in Cahaba, Alabama.

References

Further reading

External links
John McQueen's speech to the Texas Secession Convention on Feb. 1, 1861

1804 births
1867 deaths
People from Robeson County, North Carolina
Members of the Confederate House of Representatives from South Carolina
South Carolina lawyers
University of North Carolina at Chapel Hill alumni
American militiamen
Democratic Party members of the United States House of Representatives from South Carolina
19th-century American politicians
19th-century American lawyers